Semniomima is a genus of moths of the family Crambidae.

Species
Semniomima anubisalis 
Semniomima astrigalis 
Semniomima auranticeps (Hampson, 1913)
Semniomima clarissalis 
Semniomima flaviceps Burmeister, 1878
Semniomima fuscivenalis (Schaus, 1920)
Semniomima josialis (Hampson, 1918)
Semniomima ligatalis 
Semniomima mediana Schaus, 1904
Semniomima mesozonalis (Hampson, 1913)
Semniomima peruensis (Capps, 1967)
Semniomima polypaetalis (Schaus, 1920)
Semniomima polystrigalis 
Semniomima puella 
Semniomima tristrigalis (Hampson, 1913)

References

Natural History Museum Lepidoptera genus database

Pyraustinae
Crambidae genera
Taxa named by William Warren (entomologist)